Salvador "Chava" Reyes Chávez (born 4 May 1998) is a Mexican professional footballer who plays as a left-back for Liga MX club América.

International career
In December 2021, Reyes received his first call-up to the senior national team by Gerardo Martino for a friendly match against Chile set to take place on December 8.

On 8 December 2021, Reyes made his senior debut for Mexico under Gerardo Martino in a friendly match against Chile.

Career statistics

Club

International

Honours
Individual
Liga MX Best XI: Guardianes 2021, Apertura 2021
Liga MX All-Star: 2021

References

External links
 
  
 
 

1998 births
Living people
Mexican footballers
Mexico international footballers
Association football midfielders
Atlético Morelia players
Monarcas Morelia Premier players
Cimarrones de Sonora players
Liga MX players
Ascenso MX players
Liga Premier de México players
Tercera División de México players
Footballers from Guerrero
People from Taxco